All Smiles is the solo project of Jim Fairchild (born 1973), an American guitarist and singer-songwriter.

All Smiles may also refer to:

 All Smiles (Kenny Clarke/Francy Boland Big Band album), 1968
 All Smiles (Sworn In album), 2017
 All Smiles, an upcoming album by A$AP Rocky

Other uses
 All Smiles Dental Centers, a Texas dentistry franchise